Jeanne Bernard may refer to:
 Jeanne Bernard Dabos (1765–1842), French miniature painter
Jeanne Adèle Bernard (1868–1962), French couturier known as Jenny Sacerdote